Remini as a surname can refer to:
 Robert V. Remini (1921–2013), an American historian
 Leah Remini (born 1970), an American actress

See also 
 Rimini (disambiguation)